Saphir was a first-generation nuclear attack submarine of the French Navy. Saphir was the second of the Rubis series. The boat was originally to be named Bretagne, but the name was changed to Saphir before commissioning in 1981.

Service history

Between October 1989 and May 1991, the boat undertook a major refit which revolved around upgrades to the level of the lead vessel in the class, .

In September 2001, the boat torpedoed and sank a target ship, the decommissioned destroyer D'Estrées, off Toulon.

On 6 March 2015 it was reported that in a later erased blogspot of the French Ministry of Defence that during a training exercise off Florida Saphir, in her role as part of the "enemy" attack group, had "sunk" the aircraft carrier  and its escort.

After 35 years of active service, Saphir was decommissioned in July 2019, making her the first Rubis-class SSN to be decommissioned.  Saphir will be replaced by a new Barracuda-class SSN. In October 2020 it was announced that the submarine Perle would be repaired using the forward section of her decommissioned sister Saphir. The repair was to begin in January 2021 with envisaged completion in 2023.

Decorations 

The fanion of Saphir and the men's boat were decorated with the Cross for Military Valour with bronze palm on June 5, 2012.

See also 

List of submarines of France

Notes

References
 Sous-marin nucléaire d'attaque Saphir

Rubis-class submarines
Ships built in France
1981 ships